This is a list of things named after the Austrian physicist and philosopher Ludwig Eduard Boltzmann (20 February 1844 – 5 September 1906).

Science and mathematics
Boltzmann codes
Boltzmann's entropy formula 
Boltzmann's principle
Boltzmann's H-theorem
Boltzmann brain  
Boltzmann constant 
Boltzmann distribution 
Boltzmann equation
Quantum Boltzmann equation
Boltzmann factor 
Boltzmann machine 
Deep Boltzmann machine
Restricted Boltzmann machine
Boltzmann–Matano analysis 
Boltzmann relation
Boltzmann sampler
Boltzmann selection
Lattice Boltzmann methods 
Maxwell–Boltzmann distribution 
Maxwell–Boltzmann statistics 
Poisson–Boltzmann equation 
Stefan–Boltzmann law 
Stefan–Boltzmann constant
Williams–Boltzmann equation

Other

24712 Boltzmann, a main-belt asteroid 
Boltzmann (crater), an old lunar crater 
Boltzmann Medal 
Ludwig Boltzmann Gesellschaft 
Ludwig Boltzmann Institute for Neo-Latin Studies 
Ludwig Boltzmann Institut für Menschenrechte 
Ludwig Boltzmann Prize

Streets, Houses 

7 streets in Austria and 5 in Germany are named after him:
 Boltzmanngasse in Austria: Vienna (since 27 February 1913)
 Boltzmannstraße in Austria: Linz, Klagenfurt; in Germany: Berlin-Dahlem, Garching near Munich, Rhede.
 Boltzmann-Straße in Austria: Baden
 Ludwig-Boltzmann-Gasse in Graz
 Ludwig-Boltzmann-Straße in Neusiedl am See; Germany: Potsdam, Berlin-Adlershof.
 Ludwig Boltzmann-Straße in Wiener Neustadt

One house in Austria:
 Hotel Boltzmann, Vienna, is named after the address: Boltzmanngasse.

See also
 Boltzmann (disambiguation)

References

boltzman